Sixteen U.S. states have personal flags (properly called standards) for their governors, as does the commonwealth of Puerto Rico. These flags are analogous to the standards of the President and Vice President of the United States. Most of their designs are based upon either the state flag or state seal/coat of arms.


Gallery

See also 
 Governor (United States)
 Seals of governors of the U.S. states
 Coats of arms of the U.S. states
 Flag of the President of the United States
 Flag of the Vice President of the United States

References

External links

Governors